Pulau Beras is an island in western Sumatra, Indonesia. It is described in Chinese explorer Zheng He's Mao Kun map.

References

Sumatra